Marlin Schmidt  (born October 16, 1978) is a Canadian politician who currently represents the electoral district of Edmonton-Gold Bar in the Legislative Assembly of Alberta. First elected in the 2015 Alberta general election, Schmidt served as the Minister of Advanced Education in the New Democratic Party (NDP) government led by Rachel Notley.

Prior to serving with the Legislative Assembly, Schmidt specialized in site remediation for over a decade. From 2008 to 2015 he worked for Alberta Environment as a soil and groundwater contamination specialist, and previous to this, he worked as a remediation specialist, beginning in 2002. He holds a master of science degree in applied environmental geosciences from University of Tübingen in Germany and a bachelor of science from Queen's University in Kingston.

Schmidt drew criticism in July 2020 for comments he made in the Legislature about the late British Prime Minister Margaret Thatcher. His remarks were in opposition to a bill proposed by the governing United Conservative Party that modified the province's referendum laws, which Schmidt said Thatcher would have opposed. Schmidt went on to say that he "count[s] on enjoying the fact that Margaret Thatcher is still dead" and regretted she had died  "probably 30 years too late". The comments were deemed "totally inappropriate," by the Speaker of the Legislature, which prompted Schmidt to withdraw his comments and apologize.

Electoral history

2019 general election

2015 general election

2012 general election

References

1978 births
Living people
21st-century Canadian politicians
Alberta New Democratic Party MLAs
Members of the Executive Council of Alberta
Politicians from Edmonton
Queen's University at Kingston alumni
University of Tübingen alumni